Mueang Sing Buri is the capital district (amphoe mueang) of Sing Buri province, central Thailand.

History
Mueang Sing was a city before the establishment of the Sukhothai Kingdom. The old city was founded in Tambon Chaksi. King Ramathibodi I (Uthong) of Ayutthaya Kingdom set Mueang Sing, Mueang In, and Mueang Phrom as the inner cities under Lopburi, the northern frontier city of Ayutthaya. In the reign of King Trailokanat, government administration was reformed and the three cities were downgraded to be level four cities (เมืองจัตวา) because they were not far from the capital of the kingdom. When Ayutthaya was conquered by Burmese troops, Sing Buri was the city of warlord Phraya Tak (later King Taksin the Great). In 1895 King Rama V settled Monthon Thesaphiban, Sing Buri was placed in Monthon Krungkao.

It became Mueang Sing Buri District in 1901, under the name Amphoe Bang Phutsa. In 1938 the government changed the name of the capital district to be the same as the name of the province.

Geography
Neighboring districts are (from the north clockwise) In Buri of Singburi Province, Tha Wung of Lopburi province, Phrom Buri, Tha Chang, Khai Bang Rachan, and Bang Rachan of Sing Buri Province.

Administration
The district is divided into eight sub-districts (tambons).

Mueang Sing Buri